A Yevsektsiya was a Jewish section of the Soviet Communist Party. These sections were established in fall of 1918 with consent of Vladimir Lenin to carry communist revolution to the Jewish masses. The Yevsektsiya published a Yiddish periodical, der Emes.

Mission
The stated mission of these sections was the "destruction of traditional Jewish life, the Zionist movement, and Hebrew culture". The Yevsektsiya sought to draw Jewish workers into the revolutionary organisations; chairman Semyon Dimanstein, at the first conference in October 1918, pointed out that, "when the October revolution came, the Jewish workers had remained totally passive ... and a large part of them were even against the revolution. The revolution did not reach the Jewish street. Everything remained as before".

History
The Yevsektsiya remained fairly isolated from both the Jewish intelligentsia and working class. The sections were staffed mostly by Jewish ex-members of the Bund, which eventually joined the Soviet Communist Party as the Kombund in 1921, and the United Jewish Socialist Workers Party.

The Yevsektsiya deemed Russian Zionist organisations to be counter-revolutionary, and agitated for them to be shut down. Delegates to a Zionist congress in March 1919 complained about administrative harassment of their activities - not from government agencies, but from Jewish communists. At the Yevsektsiya's second conference in July 1919, it demanded that the Zionist organizations be dissolved. After an appeal from the Zionists, the All-Russian Central Executive Committee issued a decree in that the Zionist organisation was not counter-revolutionary and its activities should not be disrupted. The campaign continued, however. In 1920, the first All-Russian Zionist Congress was disrupted by members of the Cheka and a female representative of the Yevsektsiya. At its third conference in July 1921, the Yevsektsiya demanded the "total liquidation" of Zionism.

According to Richard Pipes, "in time, every Jewish cultural and social organization came under assault". Acting together with local Soviet authorities, Yevsektsiia organized seizures of synagogues in Gomel, Minsk and Kharkov, which were subsequently converted to clubs or Communist centers. The section in Rostov-on-Don persecuted local Jewish leaders, both Zionist and religious, and especially the sixth Chabad rebbe Yosef Yitzchak Schneersohn who urged his followers to resist to their last drop of blood attempts to uproot religion which went against Communist ideology, causing many of them to be arrested and sometimes killed, eventually causing the arrest of Schneersohn himself in 1927.

The Yevsektsiya attempted to use its influence to cut off state funds to Habima Theatre, branding it counter-revolutionary. The theatre left Russia to go on tour in 1926, before settling in Mandatory Palestine in 1928 to become Israel's national theatre.

Dissolution 
The Yevsektsia were disbanded as no longer needed in 1929. Many leading members were murdered during the Great Purge of the late 1930s, including Chairman Dimanstein. Executed in 1938, he was posthumously rehabilitated in 1955, two years after the death of Joseph Stalin.

See also
 History of the Jews in Russia
 Communist Party of the Soviet Union
 Bolsheviks
 Birobidzhan
 Komzet
 Jewish Communist Party (Poalei Zion)
 Bundism
Central Bureau of the Lithuanian Sections of the Russian Communist Party (Bolsheviks)

References

Further reading
 Gitelman, Zvi. Jewish Nationality and Soviet Politics: The Jewish Sections of the CPSU, Princeton, 1972.
 Dubnow, Simon. History of the Jews in Russia and Poland from the earliest times until the present day in three volumes, updated by author in 1938.
 Дубнов, Семён Маркович. Новейшая история еврейского народа (1789—1914) в 3х томах. (С эпилогом 1938 г.). Иерусалим-Москва, Мосты культуры, 2002. (in Russian)
 Костырченко, Геннадий. Тайная политика Сталина. Власть и антисемитизм. Москва, 2001.
 Евреи в Советской России (1917—1967). Иерусалим, Библиотека-Алия, 1975. (in Russian)

External links
 Revolution and Emancipation, The Yevsektsii at Beyond the Pale exhibition

Anti-Judaism
Anti-Orthodox Judaism sentiment
Bodies of the Communist Party of the Soviet Union
History of Zionism
Jewish anti-Zionism in Russia
Jewish anti-Zionism in the Soviet Union
Jewish anti-Zionist organizations
Jewish atheism
Jews and Judaism in the Soviet Union
Secular Jewish culture in Europe
Soviet phraseology